James Benson Dudley (November 2, 1859 – April 4, 1925) was President of North Carolina Agricultural and Technical State University from 1896 until his death in 1925. James B. Dudley High School in the town of Greensboro, North Carolina, where the Agricultural and Technical University is located, was named after Dudley in recognition of his work for his community.

Early life
Dudley was born on November 2, 1859. He was born into slavery; his parents were owned by Edward B. Dudley the Governor of North Carolina from 1836 to 1841. As a slave of the former governor, the governor greatly influenced Dudley. One of the governor's ideals was that everyone should be educated. Dudley took these ideas to heart and they affected his approach for the rest of his life.

Education
Because most of the schools in the area were shut down after the American Civil War due to insufficient funding, Dudley wasn't able to attend school until 1867 when the Freedmen's Bureau funded a missionary school in his area. Dudley was one of the first students to enroll. He later attended public schools when they opened in his area, and learned Latin. After going through the public school system, Dudley attended the Institute for Colored Youth in Philadelphia, Pennsylvania. For college Dudley attended Shaw College in Raleigh, North Carolina. Throughout his education he focused on learning to become an educator. In 1880, at age 21, Dudley passed the North Carolina state exam required to obtain a teacher's certificate. Later he attended Harvard summer school and gained an M.A. from Livingstone College and an LL.D. from Wilberforce University.

Employment

Peabody Graded School
Dudley went straight out of college to work as a teacher in 1880. His first teaching position was in a first grade classroom in Sampson County. The following year, due to his success, he was elected principal of Peabody Graded School in Wilmington, North Carolina, still aged only 21. The school at this time was described as being one of two "very good public schools for African Americans" in the area. He spent the next fifteen years teaching in Wilmington. He was also President of the State Teachers' Association For Negroes for six years.

Other Roles
One of his many side jobs involved editing and publishing the Wilmington Chronicle. He worked with the Chronicle for the fifteen years he stayed in Wilmington. He left the job at the Chronicle when he moved to Guilford County, leading to the closure of the publication. He was also register of deeds in Wilmington for a period of time, and organized the Perpetual Building and Loan Association.

For twenty years he was the foreign correspondent for the Grand Lodge of Masons. He also represented the Republican Party at several conventions. In 1896 he was selected to attend the Republican National Convention in St. Louis, Missouri. As an influential person in the Republican Party, as well as having connections with the Farmer's Alliance, he helped to pass a bill in 1891 that led to the establishment of The Agricultural and Mechanical College for the Colored Race, which was later renamed North Carolina Agricultural and Technical State University. In 1912 Dudley, with the help of the director of the Agricultural Division of the college, Professor J.H. Bluford, organized the Farmers' Union and Co-operative Society. This institution sponsored local unions in each county of the state. The aim of the society, which was described as having raised the living standards of African American farms in the area, was "to discourage the credit and mortgage system among Negro farmers in North Carolina; to assist them in the buying and selling of products; to control methods of production and distribution of farm products; and to secure uniform prices."

The Agricultural and Mechanical College for the Colored Race
In 1895, the North Carolina legislature appointed Dudley to the Board of Trustees for the college. Later that year, he was made secretary of the board, a position he served in until 1896 when the President, John O. Crosby, resigned. At the next meeting of the board, Dudley was voted unanimously to become the second president of the college. While president, Dudley focused on modifying the curriculum towards jobs that were currently available. He wanted the men and women who attended his college to be able to get jobs and "raise the standard of living among their people." His additions to the curriculum included the teaching of carpentry; woodturning; bricklaying; blacksmithing; animal husbandry; horticulture and floriculture; mattress and broom making; shoemaking; poultry raising; tailoring; electrical engineering; and domestic science. As well as adding these specific classes, Dudley also added an entire teaching department to the school, that taught students how to be a teacher while placing special emphasis on "courtesy, manners, and an appreciation to culture in general." He also added a summer school program.

Agricultural and Technical College
In 1915-1916 the college changed its name to "Agricultural and Technical College", as part of a major overhaul. The change was provoked by the college being in debt due to not having sufficient students enrolled to support it. Many people in the area wanted "a professional or classical education. Especially, many parents wished their sons to become preachers, lawyers, teachers, or physicians." The overhaul was Dudley's approach to addressing all of the problems. He also began offering "a course of study suited to the ability and needs of students." Another issue had been that many people opposed the co-educational student body. As a result, when the college re-opened, it was as an all-male college.

Death
Dudley's career ended while he was president at the college. In early April, Dudley left the college due to sudden severe headaches to go home and rest. For several days Dudley was able to attend to his duties from his home, until he unexpectedly died on April 4, 1925 at the age of 65. Dudley was buried in the Pine Forest cemetery on the northern end of 16th street in Wilmington, his home town. In 1929 A High School on the Eastside of Greensboro North Carolina was named after him in his honor serving The Dudley Heights, Clinton Hills, and Lincoln Heights communities on the Eastside of Greensboro N.C., becoming the first black High School in the City.

References 

1859 births
1925 deaths
African-American academics
African-American educators
19th-century American slaves
Harvard Summer School alumni
Livingstone College alumni
North Carolina A&T State University leaders
Shaw University alumni
Wilberforce University alumni
Educators from North Carolina